The Coronarctidae are a family of tardigrades. The family was first described by Jeanne Renaud-Mornant in 1974.

Genera
The family consists of two genera, Coronarctus and Trogloarctus.

References

Further reading

Renaud-Mornant, 1974 : Une nouvelle famille de Tardigrades marins abyssaux: les Coronarctidae fam. nov. (Heterotardigrada). Series D, Natural Science, vol. 278, no 24, p. 3087-3090. 

 
Tardigrade families